Mount Blachnitzky is a  mountain summit in the city and borough of Juneau, Alaska, United States.  It is a part of the Boundary Ranges of the Coast Mountains in western North America. It is located between Gilkey Glacier and Avalanche Canyon; it is named after Klaus Blachnitzky  (1921-1988), a surveyor, geodesist, and explorer of the Juneau Icefield.  Mr. Blachnitzky was the head surveyor for the Juneau Icefield Research Program. Much of his work was conducted in the vicinity of this summit. In August 1988, having completed almost two seasons instructing student surveyors and scientists in the science and practice of terrestrial field surveying and geodesy, he was killed when he slipped from a rock cleaver on the slope of Vaughan Lewis Glacier. The site of his death is four miles from the mountain named in his honor. In 2004, four climbers made a memorial climb of the previously unclimbed summit, leaving at the peak some surveying mementos of Mr. Blachnitzky's life. That first ascent was made by Scott McGee, Keith Daellenbach, Charles Daellenbach, and Fred Skemp III, on June 30, 2004, via the southwest cirque/south ridge. The mountain's name was officially adopted in 2007 by the U.S. Board on Geographic Names.

Climate

Based on the Köppen climate classification, Mount Blachnitzky has a subarctic climate with cold, snowy winters, and mild summers.. Most weather fronts originate in the Pacific Ocean, and travel east toward the Coast Mountains where they are forced upward by the range (Orographic lift), causing them to drop their moisture in the form of rain or snowfall. As a result, the Coast Mountains experience high precipitation, especially during the winter months in the form of snowfall.

See also
Geospatial summary of the High Peaks/Summits of the Juneau Icefield

References

Gallery

External links
 Mount Blachnitzky: weather forecast

Boundary Ranges
Mountains of Juneau, Alaska
Mountains of Alaska